TV-D1 (Test Vehicle Demonstration 1) will be a high altitude abort test as part of the Gaganyaan program, set to be held in February 2023.

Background
In April 2022 it was proposed that both demonstrations missions should have a depressurized crew module. On 10 August 2022 ISRO performed a successful static test from the Crew Escape System. The crew module fairing and the high altitude abort engine was delivered by Hindustan Aeronautics Limited on 18 August 2022. In December 2022, structural qualification test for Crew Module Fairing with Grid Fins was successfully completed for TV-D1 configuration.

Mission objectives
With a rocket based upon the GSLV L40 stage, TV-D1, the first development flight from the Gaganyaan program, will be launched up until 11 km from sea level, where an in-flight abort scenario will be initiated, and the capsule should flight until 15–16 km. The mission should test the separation from the rocket and its trajectory until a safe distance and parachute deployment. The capsule will have the same mass as the crewed version.

The mission will be tracked by the team at Sriharikota. If successful, India will be the fourth country, after Russia, United States and China, to master this technology.

Gaganyaan 1, the first orbital test flight, is planned to 2023.

See also

 Gaganyaan, India's crewed spacecraft
 Indian Human Spaceflight Programme
 Launch escape system

References

Bibliography

Gaganyaan
Test spaceflights
2023 in spaceflight
2023 in India